Grant County Courthouse may refer to:

 Grant County Courthouse (Kansas)
 Grant County Courthouse (Minnesota)
 Grant County Courthouse (Oklahoma)
 Grant County Courthouse (South Dakota)
 Grant County Courthouse (Washington)
 Grant County Courthouse (Wisconsin)
 Grant County Courthouse (West Virginia)